Hebrews 11 is the eleventh chapter of the Epistle to the Hebrews in the New Testament of the Christian Bible. The author is anonymous, although the internal reference to "our brother Timothy" (Hebrews 13:23) causes a traditional attribution to Paul, but this attribution has been disputed since the second century and there is no decisive evidence for the authorship. This chapter contains the exposition about the examples of faith's effective expression.

Text
The original text was written in Koine Greek. This chapter is divided into 40 verses.

Textual witnesses
Some early manuscripts containing the text of this chapter are:
Papyrus 46 (175–225; complete)
Papyrus 13 (225–50; extant verses 1–13, 28–40)
Codex Vaticanus (325–50)
Codex Sinaiticus (330–60)
Codex Alexandrinus (400–40)
Codex Freerianus (~450; extant verses 6–7, 12–15, 22–24, 31–33, 38–40)
Codex Claromontanus (~550).

Old Testament references
 : 
 :

Introductory Remarks of Faith (11:1–3)
The chapter opens with three allusive verses to describe the complexity of faith.

Verse 1

Formal definition of faith is in the style of Plato's definition of medicine (Symp. 186c) or Plutarch's definition of curiosity (On Curiosity, 6.518c).

Verse 2

The accounts of exemplary people were often used to motivate people, either to imitate noble attitudes or to avoid the pattern of ignoble behaviors, such as Ben Sira (teacher of wisdom form Jerusalem in 2nd century BC) uses a long hymn to praise notable Jewish ancestors (Sirach 44–51), or the author of 4 Macabee in 4 Macabee 16:16-23, and Seneca with similar list as in Hebrews 11 (Ben. 3.36.2–3.38.2; 5.16.1–5.17–3).

Verse 3

The list of examples starts appropriately with the creation, indicating that "faith" produces "understanding". The first manifestation of "trust" is connected to how a person of "faith" understands the visible creation as 'strictly secondary' to "things unseen".

The Primordial Heroes (11:4–7)
The first character, Abel, performed an 'acceptable sacrifice', and died as a martyr. Abel's choice of superior quality of offering compared to Cain's second rate one (Philo, Sacr. AC 52, 57, 88) is related to the presence of "faith", which attests Abel to be "righteous" or "just" (Josephus, Antiq. 1.2.1 §53). Enoch 'pleased God' ( LXX version; Masoretic text: 'walked with God') and 'translated to heaven' according to Jewish tradition (such as Sirach 44:16; Philo, Mutat. 38; Josephus, Antiq. 1.85; 1 Enoch; 2 Enoch; 3 Enoch), indicating that having faith in God leads to the transcendence of death (cf. verses 4-6, 11-12, 17-19, 35). Noah believed in the 'unseen' event of divine judgment, and 'condemned' the world that didn't believe his preaching of repentance. The LXX version of  introduces Noah both as "righteous" and "pleasing to God", thus connects naturally with "righteous" Abel and Enoch, who "pleased God".

Verse 6
But without faith it is impossible to please Him, for he who comes to God must believe that He is, and that He is a rewarder of those who diligently seek Him.
This is one of the four things to be 'impossible' according to this epistle (Hebrews 6:4; 6:18; 10:4; 11:6).
"Must believe that He is": The Arabic version renders "He is" as "He exists".

The Faith of the Patriarchs (11:8–22)
Abraham is a foremost example of faith in Jewish and early Christian literature (cf. Sirach 44:19–21; 1 Maccabee 2:52; 4 Maccabee 16:20; Wisdom 10:5; ; Romans 4).  Sarah's faith is related to the conception and birth of Isaac, Isaac's to the blessings on Jacob and Esau, Jacob's to the blessings on Ephraim and Manasseh, and Joseph's to the prophecy concerning the transfer of his bones to hint a hope for the future of the family.

The Faith of Moses (11:23–28)
Moses is known as a faithful servant of God in both Jewish and Christian writings (cf. Sirach 45:1–5; Philo, Vit. Mos. 1:10–11; Josephus Antiq. 2.218;).

The Faith of Prophets and Martyrs (11:29–40)
A group of biblical characters is listed with shorter recounts.

Verse 35

Cross reference: 2 Maccabees 7
There is hope of eternal life after torture in this world.

See also

Related Bible parts: Genesis 4, Genesis 5, Genesis 6, Genesis 12, Genesis 21, Genesis 22, Genesis 27, Genesis 50, Exodus 2, Exodus 13, Exodus 14, Joshua 2, Joshua 6, Joshua 24, Judges 4, Judges 6, Judges 11, Judges 13, 1 Samuel 1, 1 Samuel 3, 1 Samuel 17, Daniel 6, Matthew 1, Hebrews 1, James 2, 2 Peter 3

References

Bibliography

External links
 King James Bible - Wikisource
English Translation with Parallel Latin Vulgate
Online Bible at GospelHall.org (ESV, KJV, Darby, American Standard Version, Bible in Basic English)
Multiple bible versions at Bible Gateway (NKJV, NIV, NRSV etc.)

11